is a Japanese  football manager and former player. He is currently manager of J1 League club Kawasaki Frontale.

Playing career
Oniki was born in Funabashi on April 20, 1974. After graduating from high school, he joined Kashima Antlers in 1993. He played as mainly defensive midfielder. However he could not become a regular player behind Jorginho and Yasuto Honda. In 1998, he moved to Japan Football League club Kawasaki Frontale on loan. He played as regular player and the club won the 2nd place. In 1999, although he returned to Antlers, he could not play many matches. In 2000, he moved to newly promoted J1 League club, Kawasaki Frontale again. In 2000, he played many matches and the club won the 2nd place 2000 J.League Cup. Although the club finished at bottom place in the league and was relegated to J2 League, he became a regular player from 2001 season. Although his opportunity to play decreased from 2003, the club won the champions in 2004 and was promoted to J1 League. He could hardly play in the match from 2005 and he retired end of 2006 season.

Coaching career
After retirement, Oniki started coaching career at Kawasaki Frontale in 2007. He mainly served as coach for top team until 2016. In 2017, he became a manager. Frontale won the 2017 J1 League and came 2nd place in the 2017 Emperor's Cup. In 2018, Frontale won the J1 League and won again for the next 2 years in a row.

Club statistics

Managerial statistics

Honours

Manager
Kawasaki Frontale
J1 League: 2017, 2018, 2020, 2021
Emperor's Cup: 2020
J.League Cup: 2019
Japanese Super Cup: 2019, 2021

References

External links
 
 
 Profile at Kawasaki Frontale
 awx.jp

1974 births
Living people
Association football people from Chiba Prefecture
Japanese footballers
J1 League players
J2 League players
Japan Football League (1992–1998) players
Kashima Antlers players
Kawasaki Frontale players
J1 League managers
Kawasaki Frontale managers
Association football midfielders
Japanese football managers